Proof Positive may refer to:

 "Proof Positive" (Greene story), a short story by the English novelist Graham Greene
 Proof Positive (album), by American jazz musician J. J. Johnson
 Proof Positive, an album by the American ambient musician Steve Roach
 Proof Positive (TV series), an American paranormal investigation series
Proof Positive, a novel by the American writer Phillip Margolin

See also

 Positive (disambiguation)
 Proof (disambiguation)